This is list of forts in Maharashtra a state of India

 Achala Fort (Nashik)
 Agashi Fort
 Ahmednagar Fort
 Ahivant Fort
 Ajinkyatara
 Akola Fort
 Akluj Fort
 Alang Fort
 Ambolgad
 Anjaneri
 Anjanvel Fort
 Ankai Fort
 Antur Fort
 Arnala fort
 Asheri fort
 Asava fort
 Avchitgad
 Aurangabad Fort
 Avandha Fort
 Balapur Fort
 Ballarpur Fort
 Bankot fort
 Bahadur Fort
 Belapur Fort
 Birwadi fort
 Bitangad
 Bhagwantgad
 Bhairavgad
 Bhamer Dhule
 Bharatgad
 Bhaskargad/Basgad
 Bhavangad Fort/Bhondgad
 Bhorgiri fort
 Bhudargad Fort
 Bhupatgad Fort
 Bhushangad
 Bombay Castle
 Castella de Aguada/Bandra Fort
 Chanda Fort
 Chandan Fort
 Chandragad/Dhavalgad
 Chandwad fort
 Chauler Fort/Chaurgad
 Chavand fort
 Dategad
 Dativare fort
 Daulatabad Fort
 Dermal Fort
 Devgad fort
 DharmveerGad / Bahadurgad
 Dhodap
 Dhunda fort Nashik District
 Dongri Fort
 Dronagiri Fort
 Durgabhandar
 Durgadi Fort
 Dubergad Fort
 Fatte gad
 Fort George
 Gagangad
 Galna
 Gambhirgad
 Gawilghur
 Ghangad
 Ghargad
 Ghodbunder Fort
 Ghosale gad
 Goa fort
 Gondhanapur Fort, Buldhana
 Gorakhgad
 Gowalkot
 Gunvantgad
 Hadsar
 Hargad
 Harihar fort
 Harishchandragad
 Hatgad
 Irshalgad
 Indori fort, Pune District
 Indrai fort, Nashik District
 Jadhavgadh, Pune District
 Jaigad Fort, Ratnagiri District
 Jamgaon Fort
 Jamner Fort
 Jangali Jayagad Satara District
 Janjira fort, Raigad District
 Javlya fort
 Jivdhan
 Kalanandigad
 Kalavantin Durg
 Kaladgad
 Kaldurg Fort
 Kalyangad/ Nandgiri
 Kamalgad
 Kamandurg Fort
 Kandhar Fort
 Kanchana Fort
 Kanhera Fort (Chalisgaon)
 Kanhera Fort
 Kankrala
 Karnala Fort
 Kavnai fort
 Kelve Fort
 Kenjalgad
 Khanderi
 Kharda / Shivpattan Fort
 Kohoj Fort
 Kolaba Fort
 Koldher Fort
 Konkan Diva Fort 
 Korlai Fort
 Korigad 
 Kothaligad / Bhairavgad (Kothali)
 Kulang Fort
 Kunjargad
 Kurdugad
 Laling fort
 Lingana
 Lohagad
 Machindragad
 Machnur Fort
 Madangad Fort
 Madh Fort
 Mailagad Fort/Mahelagad (Buldhana)
 Mahim Fort
 Mahimangad
 Mahipalgad
 Mahipatgad
 Mahur Fort
 Mahuli
 Makrandgad
 Malanggad
 Malegaon fort
 Malhargad/Sonori Fort
 Manaranjan Fort
 Mandangad fort
 Mangad Fort/Fort Mangad
 Mangalgad/ Kangori fort
 Mangi-Tungi
 Manikgad ( Dist.-Chandrapur)
 Manikgad (Raigad)
 Manjarsubha Fort
 Manohargad-Mansantoshgad
 Markanda Fort
 Mazagon Fort
 Mohandar fort/ Shidka fort
 Mohangad
 Mora fort
 Morgiri Fort
 Mrugagad
 Mulher
 Naldurg Fort
 Nanded fort
 Nandoshi fort
 Narayangad
 Narnala
 Narsimhagad
 Nhavigad
 Nimgiri-Hanumantgad fort
 Nivati fort
 Pabargad
 Padargad
 Padmadurg
 Palgad
 Palashi Fort
 Pandavgad
 Panhala Fort
 Paranda Fort
 Pargadh
 Parola Fort
 Patta Fort
 Pavangad
 Pemgiri Fort/ Shahagad
 Pisola fort
 Pimpalgaon Raja fort Buldhana

 Prabalgad
 Prachitgad
 Pratapgad
 Purandar fort
 Purnagad
 Rangana Fort
 Raigad Fort
 Rajgad Fort
 Rajdher fort
 Ramsej
 Ramtek
 Rasalgad
 Ratangad
 Ratnagiri
 Ravlya Fort
 Revdanda fort
 Riwa Fort
 Rohida fort
 Sagargad
 Sajjangad
 Salher
 Salota fort
 Samangad
 Sakharkherda Fort , Buldhana
 Sangram Durg
 Santoshgad
 Sarasgad
 Sarjekot fort
 Sewri Fort
 Shaniwar Wada
 Shirgaon Fort
 Shivgad
 Shivneri
 Shrivardhan Fort
 Siddhagad
 Sindhudurg Fort
 Sinhagad
 Sion Hillock Fort
 Sitabuldi Fort
 Solapur Fort
 Sondai fort
 Songir
 Songiri
 Sudhagad
 Sumargad
 Surgad
 Suvarnadurg
 Talagad
 Tandulwadi fort 
 Tailbaila fort
 Takmak fort
 Tankai fort
 Tarapur fort
 Terekhol Fort
 Thalner
 Tikona
 Tipagad (Gadchiroli)
 Tringalwadi
 Trymbakgad
 Torna Fort
 Tung Fort
 Tungi
 Udgir Fort
 Underi
 Vaghera Fort
 Vairagad Fort
 Vairatgad Fort
 Vajragad
 Vandan Fort (Satara)
 Vardhangad Fort
 Varugad
 Vasai Fort/Bassein Fort
 Vasantgad
 Vasota Fort/ Vyaghragad
 Vijaydurg Fort
 Vijaygad Fort
 Vikatgad
 Visapur Fort
 Vishalgad/Khelna Fort
 Worli Fort
 Yashwantgad Fort
 padmdurang fort
 mankigad fort
 Dhak bahiri
 sakshigad
 gopalgad
 metghar fort ,nashik
 vijaygadh fort
 jaigad fort
 sarjekot fort
 ratandurg fort
 vijaydurg fort
 devgad fort
 chakan fort
 ramshej fort
 hadsar fort
 Ghangad fort
 bhivgad fort
 machindragad
 raireshwar
 Gumtara Fort

See also
List of forts in India

References

 List of Forts in Maharashtra

 
M
F
F